Loxsomopsis is a genus of ferns with a single described species, Loxsomopsis pearcei, found in eastern Central and South America, from Costa Rica to Ecuador. In the Pteridophyte Phylogeny Group classification of 2016 (PPG I), the genus is placed in the family Loxsomataceae. Other sources place it in an expanded family Cyatheaceae.

References

Cyatheales
Monotypic fern genera